List of notable Old Aquinians, who were students of Aquinas College Perth (1938–present) and its predecessor CBC Perth (1894–1937).

Government

Executive

Federal Cabinet
 Hon. Sir Fred Chaney Sr. KBE AFC (1914–2001) (Class of 1932, CBC Perth) – Minister for the Navy 1964–1966, MHR for Perth 1955–1969
 Hon. Fred Chaney Jr. AO (Class of 1957) – Minister for Administrative Services 1978, Minister for Aboriginal Affairs 1978–1980, Minister for Social Security 1980–1983, Senator for Western Australia 1974–1990, MHR for Pearce 1990–1993
 Hon. Peter Durack QC (1926–2008) (Class of 1942) – Minister for Veterans Affairs 1976–77, Attorney-General 1977–1983, Senator for Western Australia 1971–1993
State Cabinet
 Sean L'Estrange (Class of 1985) – Minister for Finance 2016–2017, Minister for Mines & Petroleum 2016–2017, Minister for Small Business 2016–2017, MLA for Churchlands 2013–2021
 Emil Nulsen (1885–1965) (Class of 1903, CBC Perth) – Minister for Justice 1939–1947 and 1952–1959, Minister for Railways 1939–1945, Minister for Health 1945–1947 and 1953–1959 MLA for Kanowna 1932–1950, MLA for Eyre 1950–1962
 Hon. John Quigley – Attorney-General 2017–present, MLA for Innaloo 2001–2005, MLA for Mindarie 2005–2013, MLA for Butler 2013–present
 Hon. Ben Wyatt (Class of 1991) – Treasurer 2017–2021, Minister for Finance 2017–2021, Minister for Aboriginal Affairs 2017–2021, Minister for Energy 2017–2018, Minister for Lands 2018–2021, MLA for Victoria Park 2006–2021

Legislative
State Parliament
 Ignatius Boyle (1882–1960) (Class of 1897, CBC Perth) – MLA for Avon 1935–1943

Mayors
 Hon. Sir Fred Chaney Sr. KBE AFC (1914–2001) (Class of 1932, CBC Perth) – Lord Mayor of Perth 1978–1982
 Sir Thomas Meagher (1902–1979) (Class of 1919, CBC Perth) – Lord Mayor of Perth 1940–1945
 Eric Silbert AM DFC (1922−2007) (Class of 1938) − Deputy Lord Mayor of Perth 1978–1979

Judiciary
 Hon. John Chaney (Class of 1970) – Justice of the District Court of WA 2004–2009, President of the State Administrative Tribunal 2009–2014, Justice of the Supreme Court of WA 2009–2018
 Hon. Maurice Cullity KC (Class of 1953) – Justice of the Ontario Court of Justice 1997−1999, Justice of the Ontario Superior Court of Justice 1999−2010
 Hon. Edward Arthur Dunphy QC (1907–1989) – Justice of the Supreme Court of the ACT 1958–1993, Justice of the Supreme Court of the NT 1961–1979 (CBC Perth)
 Hon. Eric Heenan KC (Class of 1962) – Justice of the Supreme Court of WA 2002–2015
 Sir John Lavan (1911–2006) – Justice of the Supreme Court of WA 1969–1981 (CBC Perth)
 Hon. Rene Le Miere KC (Class of 1962) – Justice of the Supreme Court of WA 2004–2022
 John Staude (Class of 1975) – Justice of the District Court of WA 2010–present

Public Service
 David Fenbury (1916–1976) (Class of 1932, CBC Perth) – senior public servant, delegate to the secretariat of the Trusteeship Council of the United Nations, New York
 The Most Reverend Sir Lancelot Goody KBE (1908–1992) – sixth Archbishop of Perth 1968–1983 and first Bishop of Bunbury 1954–1968 (CBC Perth)
 Christopher Shanahan SC – senior counsel barrister, acting commissioner of the Corruption and Crime Commission in Western Australia
 Judah Waten AM (1911–1985) – political activist, writer and publisher (briefly attended CBC Perth)
 Michael Wood (Class of 1961) − senior public servant
 Cedric Wyatt (Class of 1957) – Aboriginal rights activist

Military
 Brigadier Rod Curtis AM MC (Class of 1958) − Commanding Officer of Special Air Service Regiment 1979−1982
 Lt Col James McMahon DSC AM DSM (Class of 1981) − Commanding Officer of Special Air Service Regiment 2005−2006
 Brigadier Gerry Warner AM LVO (Class of 1966) − Chief of Staff Land Headquarters 1999−2002

Academia and Science

Rhodes Scholars
 1906: Dr. Alexander Juett (1886–1953) (Class of 1905, CBC Perth)
 1908: Dr. John Horan (1890–1945) (Class of 1907, CBC Perth)
 1911: Dr. John Savage (1890–1948) (Class of 1909, CBC Perth) 
 1913: Alaric Pinder Boor (1892–1917) (Class of 1912, CBC Perth)
 1949: Hon. Peter Durack QC (1926–2008) (Class of 1942)
 1958: Hon. Maurice Cullity KC (Class of 1953)
 1987: William Jack (Class of 1983)
 2009: John McAnearney (Class of 2003)

Chancellor
 Michael Chaney AO (Class of 1967) – Chancellor, University of Western Australia

Others, academia and science
 Richard Fox (Class of 1960) – medical physicist
 Alan Lopez AC (Class of 1968) - epidemiologist, academic and professor
 Professor Ivan Kennedy AM (Class of 1956) – biochemist, academic and professor
 Peter Klinken AC (Class of 1970) – biochemist, medical researcher and academic
 Anthony Power (Class of 1975) - barrister, adjunct professor at the University of Notre Dame and Murdoch University

Arts, Entertainment and Media
 Reg Cribb (Class of 1980) – actor and playwright
 Geoff Gibbs AM (Class of 1957) – actor and principal of WAAPA
 Peter Kennedy (Class of 1959) - political journalist and author
 Trevor Kennedy AM (1942–2021) (Class of 1959) – editor-in-chief of Consolidated Press Holdings see Business
 Paul Lockyer (Class of 1967) – news reporter
 Mark Priestley (1976–2008) (Class of 1993) – actor
 Dave Warner (Class of 1970) – author, musician and screenwriter

Business
 Michael Chaney AO (Class of 1967) – chair of National Australia Bank, Woodside Petroleum; CEO of Wesfarmers
 Denis Cullity AO CMG (1928–2022) (Class of 1945) – forestry and timber industry leader, founder and chariman of Wesbeam
 Dr Tom Cullity (1925–2008) (Class of 1941) – cardiologist, Margaret River region winemaking pioneer and foudner of Vasse Felix
 Herb Elliott AC MBE (Class of 1955) – chair of Fortescue Metals Group, Puma (also attended CBC Perth)
 Trevor Flugge AO – chair of AWB Limited
 Brendan Gore – CEO of Peet Limited
 Dr Lachlan Henderson (Class of 1982) − CEO of HBF
 Peter Hutchinson (Class of 1976) − CEO of Forge Group
 Trevor Kennedy AM (1942–2021) (Class of 1959) – CEO of AWA, business director business director see Arts, entertainment, and media
 Jack Kilfoyle (1893–1962) (Class of 1914, CBC Perth) – pastoralist, Rosewood station 
 Victor Paino AM (Class of 1955) – seafood retail pioneer
 Pat Prendiville (1923–2019) (Class of 1940) − publican and hospitality industry pioneer
 Peter Smedley AM (1943–2019) – CEO of Colonial Mutual

Engineering and Construction
 Ken Kelsall AM (1921–2015) (Class of 1938) – engineer, pioneer in the development of the water industry in Western Australia
 Peter Moore PSM (Class of 1966) – engineer, COO of Water Corporation
 Geoff Summerhayes OAM (1928–2010) (Class of 1945) – architect, President of the Royal Australian Institute of Architects (Western Australia)
 Robert Torrance AM (Class of 1954) – master builder

Sport

Australian rules football
Australian Football League
 Ben Allan (Class of 1987) – Hawthorn premiership player 1991, Fremantle inaugural captain
 Liam Baker (Class of 2015) – Richmond premiership player 2019 and 2020
 Peter Bell (Class of 1992) – North Melbourne premiership player 1996 and 1999, Fremantle captain
 Simon Black (Class of 1997) – Brisbane Lions premiership player 2001, 2002 and 2003, Brownlow Medal 2002, Norm Smith Medal 2003
 Charlie Cameron (Class of 2011) – Adelaide, Brisbane Lions
 Jarrod Cameron (Class of 2017) – West Coast Eagles
 Brant Colledge (Class of 2012) – West Coast Eagles
 Patrick Cripps (Class of 2012) – Carlton captain, Brownlow Medal 2022
 Paul Duffield (Class of 2002) – Fremantle
 Nat Fyfe (Class of 2008) – Fremantle captain, Brownlow Medal 2015 and 2019
 Robbie Haddrill (Class of 1998) – Fremantle
 Daniel Kerr (Class of 2000) – West Coast Eagles premiership player 2006
 Mark LeCras (Class of 2004) – West Coast Eagles premiership player 2018
 Quinten Lynch (Class of 2000) – West Coast Eagles premiership player 2006, Collingwood
 Logan McDonald (Class of 2019) – Sydney Swans
 Jamie Merillo (Class of 1989) – Fremantle
 Jesse Motlop (Class of 2021) – Carlton
 Stephen O'Reilly (Class of 1989) – Geelong, Fremantle and Carlton
 Deven Robertson (Class of 2018) – Brisbane Lions
 Trey Ruscoe (Class of 2019) – Collingwood
 Jeremy Sharp (Class of 2019) – Gold Coast Suns
 David Sierakowski (Class of 1992) – St Kilda, West Coast Eagles
 Alan Toovey (Class of 2004) – Collingwood premiership player 2010
 Chad Warner (Class of 2018) – Sydney Swans
 Elliot Yeo (Class of 2011) – Brisbane Lions, West Coast Eagles
Victorian Football League
 Gerry Bahen (1929–2012) – North Melbourne
 Ross Ditchburn (Class of 1974) – Carlton premiership player 1982
 Peter Spencer (Class of 1973) – North Melbourne, also WA state representative and dual Sandover Medal winner 1976 and 1984 – Western Australian Football Hall of Fame 2007
 Alan Johnson (Class of 1974) - Melbourne Football Club (1982-1990) and Perth Football Club (1975-1981), played 5 State of Origins for Western Australia.Johnson twice won the Keith 'Bluey' Truscott Medal for Melbourne's best and fairest player, in 1983 and 1989. In 1989 he was also named in the VFL Team of the Year
Western Australian Football League
 John Bridgwood – Claremont, WA state representative
 David Crawford – Claremont premiership player 2011 and 2012 - WA state representative
 David Gault (Class of 1992) – South Fremantle premiership player 1997 and 2005 and captain 
 Percy Johnson – East Fremantle premiership player 1957, Swan Districts captain coach, and Claremont, WA state representative and Channel 7 football critic – Western Australian Football Hall of Fame 2010
 Simon McPhee – Claremont premiership coach 2011
 Terry Moriarty – Perth, Sandover Medal winner 1943 – Western Australian Football Hall of Fame 2010 (also attended St Patrick's Boys School)
 Murray Ward (Class of 1954) – Claremont, also coached Aquinas to 13 consecutive PSA premierships
 Frank Walker – Perth, WA state representative

Basketball
 Bradley Ness OAM (Class of 1991) – wheelchair basketball Sydney Paralympics 2000, Athens Paralympics 2004 silver medal Australia, Beijing Paralympics 2008 gold medal Australia and captain, London Paralympics 2012 silver medal Australia
 Corey Shervill (Class of 2015) – Perth Wildcats

Cricket
Test
 Terry Alderman
 Cameron Bancroft (Class of 2010)
 Ernest Bromley (1912–1967) (Class  of 1928, CBC Perth) – first Western Australian Test cricketer 
 Brad Hogg (Class of 1988)
 Justin Langer AM (Class of 1987)

One Day and Twenty20 International
 Nathan Coulter-Nile – One Day International and Twenty20 International Australia, first-class cricket Western Australia, Perth Scorchers, Mumbai Indians

First-class
 Aaron Hardie (Class of 2016) - Western Australia, Perth Scorchers, Surrey
 Alex Hepburn – Worcestershire
 Tom Outridge, Jr – Western Australia
 Kevin Prindiville – Western Australia
 Terry Prindiville – Western Australia
 Sean Terry – Hampshire
 Darren Wates – Western Australia

Cycling
 Ben O'Connor (Class of 2013) – Team Dimension Data, 1st Overall New Zealand Cycle Classic 2016

Olympics
Athletics
 Herb Elliott AC MBE (Class of 1955) – Rome 1960 gold medal 1500m Australia (also attended CBC Perth)

Hockey
 David Bell OAM (Class of 1972) – Montreal 1976 silver medal Australia – Western Australia Hockey Hall of Fame
 Don Martin (Class of 1957) – Tokyo 1964 bronze medal Australia, Mexico 1968 silver medal Australia
 Aran Zalewski (Class of 2008) - Tokyo 2020 silver medal Australia

Volleyball
 Luke Smith (Class of 2007) – London 2012

Water polo
 Tim Neesham – Sydney 2000, Athens 2004, & Beijing 2008
 Tom Hoad AM (Class of 1957) – Rome 1960; Australian captain Tokyo 1964, Mexico 1968, and Munich 1972; Australian water polo coach Montreal 1976, Moscow 1980, Los Angeles 1984 and Seoul 1988

Rowing
 Ross Brown – world championships: 2007 men's light coxless pair, bronze medal Australia; 2010 men's lightweight eight, silver medal Australia
 Alexander Cunningham (Max) – W.A King’s Cup Rowing 8 winning crew Launceston 1960; Australian Olympic 8 Oarsman Rome 1960
 Nick Garratt AM (Class of 1965) – King’s Cup rower, national and Olympic rowing coach
 David McGowan – junior world champion 1999, Athens 2004 men's coxless four
 Stuart Reside – Sydney 2000 quadruple men's scull, Athens 2004 bronze medal men's eight Australia

Rugby
 Kyle Godwin (Class of 2009) – Western Force, ACT Brumbies and Connacht
 Zack Holmes (Class of 2007) – ACT Brumbies, Western Force, La Rochelle, Toulouse and Bordeaux Bègles

See also

 List of schools in Western Australia
 List of boarding schools
 Public Schools Association

References

External links 
 Aquinas College official website
 Old Aquinians Association official website

Lists of people educated in Western Australia by school affiliation